The 2014–15 Utah Utes women's basketball team will represent the University of Utah during the 2014–15 NCAA Division I men's basketball season. They will play their home games at the Jon M. Huntsman Center in Salt Lake City, Utah and were a member of the Pac-12 Conference. The Utes were led by their fifth year head coach Anthony Levrets. They finished the season 9–21, 3–15 in Pac-12 play  to finish in a tie for eleventh place. They lost in the first round of the Pac-12 women's tournament to Washington.

Roster

Schedule and results 

|-
!colspan=9 style="background:#CC0000; color:white;"| Exhibition

|-
!colspan=9 style="background:#CC0000; color:white;"| Regular Season

|-
!colspan=9 style="background:#CC0000;"| Pac-12 Women's Tournament

See also
2014–15 Utah Utes men's basketball team

References 

Utah
Utah Utes
Utah Utes
Utah Utes women's basketball seasons